Henry Bond (born 1966) is an English writer, photographer, and visual artist.

Henry Bond may also refer to:
 Henry Bond (physician) (1801–1883), British physician and academic
 Henry Bond (Master of Trinity Hall, Cambridge) (1853–1938), British academic
 Henry Whitelaw Bond (1848–1919), Missouri Supreme Court justice
 Henry Bond (British Army officer) (1873–1919), Irish cricketer and British Army officer